Michael Huckaby (c. 1966 – April 24, 2020) was an American DJ who produced electronic music.

Biography
He began his DJ career in 1995, playing a combination of Detroit techno, groove, and jazz music.

Starting in the late 1980s, Huckaby was a widely recognized DJ in the Detroit area, holding residencies at the Motor Lounge, St. Andrew's Hall, Panacea and the Majestic Cafe.

In addition to his DJ career, Huckaby was a volunteer mentor at the non-profit Youthville program, where he taught courses in music production to young people with an interest in electronic music.

Huckaby suffered a mild stroke in early March 2020, and was hospitalized. He died from hospital-acquired COVID-19 on April 24, 2020, at age 54.

Discography
Deep Transportation Vol. 1 (1995)
Deep Transportation Vol. 2 (1997)
The Jazz Republic (1997)
Harmonie Park Classics Vol. 1 (2002)
Classics Series Vol. 2 (2004)
My Life With The Wave (2007)
Sessions (2007)

References

2020 deaths
1960s births
Year of birth uncertain
Deep house musicians
DJs from Detroit
African-American musicians
20th-century American musicians
20th-century American male musicians
21st-century American musicians
21st-century American male musicians
Deaths from the COVID-19 pandemic in Michigan
21st-century African-American musicians